Lexi Wilson (born 1993) is a Bahamian model and beauty pageant titleholder who won Miss Universe Bahamas 2013 and represented her country at the Miss Universe 2013 pageant.

Early life 
In 1993,  Wilson was born in Nassau, Bahamas.

Below Deck Mediterranean
Lexi appeared on Below Deck Mediterranean season 6 in 2021.  She was fired mid-season.  Lexi's behaviour was described by Captain Sandy as "Disturbing, and I wish that the crew would have really painted the picture for me. Just hearing it's bad isn't a description of behavior. So you know, in a position that I'm in, I need to know details and I never really got details until the end, and that's when I let Lexi go.".

References

 

1991 births
Bahamian beauty pageant winners
Langston University alumni
Living people
Miss Universe 2013 contestants
People from Nassau, Bahamas